Lady of the Night (also known as Angelina and Angelina: Lady of the Night) is a  1986  Italian erotic romantic drama film written and directed by Piero Schivazappa.

Plot 
Simona and Marco live in a pleasant apartment in the centre of Rome and drive a large Lancia but, after three years of marriage, Simona feels unfulfilled. Remembering the passion when they first met, and wondering whether this could now be found with a stranger, she lets herself be seduced in the hallway of their building and later in a public toilet. 

When a couple come to dinner and at the end all four drive to the seaside, she is having sex with the other man when Marco finds them. After he beats the man unconscious and then beats Simona, she leaves him to stay with a friend from her aerobics class. 

When two attempts at reconciliation fail, Simona decides that she needs a baby and has her IUD removed. A few days later, to her horror, she is raped in her friend's apartment by an intruder whose face she never sees. On the floor afterwards, she finds a medallion that had fallen from his neck in the struggle: it is one she gave to Marco, engraved with his name. Taking it back to him, she finds that the passion has returned to their marriage.

Cast 
 Serena Grandi as Simona
 Fabio Sartor as Marco
 Francesca Topi as Giuliana
 Alberto Di Stasio as Ettore
 Tiberio Mitri as The Barman

See also    
 List of Italian films of 1986

References

External links
 
 
 Lady of the Night at Variety Distribution

1986 films
Italian erotic drama films
Films directed by Piero Schivazappa
Films scored by Guido & Maurizio De Angelis
Erotic romance films
1986 romantic drama films
1980s erotic drama films
1980s English-language films
1980s Italian-language films
1980s Italian films